High school or senior high school is the education students receive in the final stage of secondary education in the United States. In the United States, this lasts from approximately 13/14, 14/15, or 15/16 to 17/18 years old in most cases. Most comparable to secondary schools, high schools generally deliver phase three of the ISCED model of education. High schools have subject-based classes. The name high school is applied in other countries, but no universal generalization can be made as to the age range, financial status, or ability level of the pupils accepted. In North America, most high schools include grades nine through twelve. Students attend them following graduation from middle school (often alternatively called junior high school).

History

The first institution labeled as a "high school" was Edinburgh's Royal High School in Scotland, which was founded in 1128. The Royal High School was used as a model for the first public high school in the United States, Boston Latin School, founded in Boston, Massachusetts in 1635. Boston Latin School was initially a private school, so although it did become the first public high school, a school system in Dedham, Massachusetts was the first to be supported by public taxation. The schools prepared boys for the law or the church. The length of the school day varied with the seasons, but there was a shortage of Latin speakers available to become teachers because the job was unattractive due to low status and low pay. The colony ordered in the English Protestant Tutor, retitled as The New England Primer, to be used as a textbook. This was the start of a secondary education system.

In 1642, the Massachusetts Bay Colony was able to pass a law to require parents to make sure that their children were able to read, which required some form of elementary education. In 1647, Massachusetts again passed a law that required communities to establish some type of public schooling system. Elementary schools were to be formed in every town with 50 or more families, and every town with at least 100 families would have to provide a Latin Grammar School.

Over a century later in 1779, Thomas Jefferson proposed the opening of new secondary schools to provide segregated secondary schools with different tracks in his words for "the laboring and the learned." The new academies would be practical in nature but allow a few of the working class to advance by "raking a few geniuses from the rubbish."

In 1785, before the U.S. Constitution was ratified, the Continental Congress passed a law calling for a survey of the Northwest Territory, which included what was to become the state of Ohio. The law created townships, reserving a portion of each township for a local school. Under the constitution, education was relegated to individual states.

The Pennsylvania state constitution, written in 1790, calls for free public education, but only for poor children, assuming that the rich will pay for their own children's schooling. In 1805, the New York Public School Society was formed by the wealthy to provide education to the poor. These schools were run on the Lancasterian system, in which one "master" taught hundreds of students in a single room. The masters would give rote lessons to the older students, who would then pass it down to the younger students. Society was moving from an agrarian model with small independent plots to an industrial one, where workers needed to be literate and numerate. Lancastrian schools emphasized discipline and obedience: qualities that factory owners needed in their workers.

An 1817 Boston Town Meeting petitioned for the establishment of a system of free public primary schools. The main support came from local merchants, businessmen, and wealthier artisans, while many wage earners opposed it because they knew they would be paying for it through income taxation. In spite of this, Boston Latin School became public in 1820. This was the first public high school in the United States. Seven years later, a state law in Massachusetts made all grades of public school open to all pupils, free of charge.

However, in the slave-owning states, things were different. Even after public schools were being opened up to all ages in Massachusetts, in the 1830s, it was illegal in southern states to teach black children to read. High schools were out of the question. After many years of advocacy, in 1957, federal court ordered the integration of Little Rock, Arkansas public schools. The governor sent in troops to physically prevent nine African American students from enrolling at all-white Central High School. Though, this decision was overturned by the president. The same delay in equality in public high schools can be accounted for the general regarding of other groups as minorities in the US.

Typical American high school
While there is no set standard for American high schools, some generalizations can be made about the majority. Public schools are managed by local, elected school districts. There is a range in quality from basic education to more intellectually-stimulating environments for students approximately 14 to 18 years of age.

Students enter around the age of 14 (sometimes 13) and pass through four years (sometimes five):
Eighth grade; (the equivalent of the year 9 in the English System ,sometimes)
Freshman (ninth grade; the equivalent of the year 10 in the English System) 
Sophomore (tenth grade; the equivalent of year 11 in the English System)
Junior (eleventh grade; the equivalent of year 12 in the English System)
Senior (twelfth grade; the equivalent of year 13 in the English System)
School years are normally around nine months long (from August or September to May or June), and are broken up into quarters or semesters. College entry is controlled by many factors including Grade Point Average (GPA), and an elective SAT or ACT exam run by two non-profit organizations: the College Board and the ACT, respectively.

Smaller schools can educate fewer than 200 pupils in total, while some teach over 4,000 at any given time.

Typical day
The typical high school day includes:

Students arrive between seven and nine in the morning and leave school between two and four in the afternoon.
Four to eight 40 to 90 minute class periods, broken up by around five minutes to get to the next class (schools may hold classes daily for a shorter time (traditional scheduling) or alternate days for an extended session (block scheduling).
A lunch break (some schools permit students to leave campus to eat, though most hold lunches on-site).
Homework amount differs depending on the school's purpose and culture.
Extracurricular sports team activities right after school (sometimes track, field, and swim sports hold practices in the early morning before the school day starts)

Focus    
The high school may emphasize various opportunities for students:
general education
high-achieving college prep (ex. Advanced Placement (AP))
vocational-technical
specialties such as arts, music, theater, STEM (science, technology, engineering and mathematics)
sports

Curriculum

A high school curriculum is defined in terms of Carnegie Units, which approximate to 120 class contact hours within a year. This is one hour a day, five days a week for twenty-four weeks. Students who satisfactorily complete a unit are awarded a credit. No two schools will be the same, and no two students will have the same classes. There are some general principles, however. Students can also be on different programs within the same school with Advanced/Honors, CP (College Preparatory), AP (Advanced Placement), and IB (International Baccalaureate) classes.

Students typically do four years of study, with eight core subjects and electives, both of which vary by school. Passing a course earns credit and students must earn at least 30 credits to graduate, among other requirements. Study halls are sometimes offered, which don't contribute to GPA or number of credits earned.

Grading

Primarily, evaluations can be expressed as a percentage score or a letter grade. For percentage scores, the typical practice is to start at 100% and deduct points for deficiences.

The relationship between percentage scores and letter grades depends on the method of grading. In the absence of national grading standards, some high schools use norm-referenced grading (commonly called "grading on a curve") which allocates grades across the distribution of scores based on a predetermined formula. Most high schools, though, use criterion-referenced grading which corresponds percentages to letter grades according to a fixed scale:

For each course, the student's assignment scores or grades across the term are averaged according to weights established by the teacher. This produces the course grade. A report card lists all of the student's course grades for the term, translates these to grade point equivalents, and calculates a Grade Point Average (GPA) weighted by the number of credits earned for each class. A transcript lists the course grades received during the student's entire tenure at the school and compiles them into a cumulative GPA.

Physical education requirements
2014 recommended federal standards for Physical Education are at least 225 minutes of P.E. a week for middle school and high school. The standards involve:
 Competency in motor skills and movement patterns,
 Understanding of movement concepts,
 Regular participation in physical activity,
 Achievement and maintenance of health‐related fitness,
 Responsible behavior in physical activity settings, and
 Value of physical activity.

Media

High schools are depicted in many teenage-orientated films and television soap operas. Almost universally, these films fall into the comedy or social issues/drama genre categories.

High school films from Hollywood rarely discuss the economic disparities between the social classes where the poor gravitate to the lower esteemed courses.

References

External links
 Requirements for high school graduation, in Carnegie units: 2004